The 2005 St Kilda Football Club season was the 109th in the club's history. Coached by Grant Thomas and captained by Nick Riewoldt, they competed in the AFL's 2005 Toyota Premiership Season.

Standings

References

External links
 
 Listing of St Kilda games in 2005

St Kilda Football Club seasons